Éditions Hortus is an independent French disk label, offering largely unknown songs and works for the organ in addition to contemporary compositions. Specialised in organ and choir music, it has in particular presented disks recorded at the Notre Dame de Paris and of its choir 'Les Éléments', as well as of the young harpsichordist Benjamin Alard.

Éditions Hortus wishes to produce disks containing rare or even previously unrecorded music.

Vincent Genvrin is the label's artistic director. Didier Maes is its executive producer.

History
Founded in 1994, Éditions Hortus first showed its interest in disks with Via crucis (Stations of the Cross) by Franz Liszt, interpreted by the Sacrum Choir from Riga. The CD was accompanied by a series of fifteen screenprints by Daniel Vincent and Guillaume Dégé, printed in a limited, numbered edition.

On 17 November 2006, Didier Maes, producer of the label, was a guest in the France Musique programme "Par ici les sorties!" (Releases over here!), to present a selection of four Hortus disks.

In the spring of 2010, backed by the Conseil Général du Loiret, Éditions Hortus joined the "Amis de l'Orgue de Lorris" to record 17th-century Iberian and Flemish music, interpreted by organist Damien Colcomb in the communal 12th-century church.

On 7 February 2011, the Éditions Hortus catalogue listed 79 recordings available only on CD.

Principal artists

Classical 

The chamber choir Les Éléments, directed by Joël Suhubiette, received the Victoire de la musique classique for best vocal ensemble in 2006.

Harpsichord 
 Benjamin Alard, Prize of the jury and Prize of the public at the Harpsichord competition of Brugge 2004. In 2005, with Hortus, Benjamin Alard made his first recording 'which revealed him to the general audience', an anthology of keyboard music for harpsichord and organ; the disk was immediately taken up by the critics. In December 2006, Hortus recorded a collection of transcriptions for harpsichord of pieces by Reincken and Vivaldi. Three years later, Alard's interpretation of the Bauyn Manuscript (Éditions Hortus, 2008) was very well received by music critics.
 Freddy Eichelberger
 Laurent Stewart

Clavichord 
 Cristiano Holtz

Organ

Piano 
 François Lambret
 Bruno Robilliard
 Nicolas Stavy. His interpretation of 'Four ballades op. 10', 'Third Sonata op. 5' and 'Theme and Variations in D minor' by Johannes Brahms (Éditions Hortus, 2008) was hailed by music critics.
 Isabelle Oehmichen

Flute 
 Élise Battais

Harmonium 
 Kurt Lueders

Jazz 
 Guillaume de Chassy
 Jean-Marie Machado

Organist-composers

References

External links
  

French record labels